The southern two-lined salamander (Eurycea cirrigera) is a species of salamander in the family Plethodontidae, endemic to the United States. Its natural habitats are temperate forests, rivers, intermittent rivers, swamps, and freshwater springs.

Appearance
The southern two-lined salamander is a small thin salamander, distinguished by the two lines running down the lateral portion of its body. The salamander is deep-light brown and fairly small, growing up to 6.5–12 cm in length. The species has 14 costal grooves between its limbs. The key difference between the Southern two lined salamander from the Northern salamander is that the black lines run all the way down to the tail. When the salamander reaches sexual maturity males begin to show Cirri and enlarged jaw muscles.

The southern two-lined salamander had two morphs, one of these, the Brownback salamander is now its own species. The other morphs, the Cole Springs Phenotype is found in other two lined salamanders but in the southern two-lined salamander is limited to northern Alabama. This morphs results in an individual being significantly larger and darker colored than the normal salamander.

Range 
The southern two-lined salamander is found in the Southeast United States except for peninsular Florida.

Conservation
It has been noted by researchers that as the watersheds are being urbanized the capacity of streams to be habitable for southern two-lined salamander decreases. Although this species is not in a concerned status for conservation, it has been recommended that unbreached buffers be created in streams to preserve the habitat for this species.

References

http://www.dgif.virginia.gov/wildlife/information/?s=020050
Server, David M. Comments on the Taxonomy and Morphology of Two-Lined Salamanders of the Eurycea Bislineata Complex. Chicago Herpitilogical Society. Saint Mary's College, n.d. Web. 5 May 2014. <http://www2.southeastern.edu/Academics/Faculty/dsever/EuryceaCHS1989.pdf>.

MAUGER, D., BELL, T., & PETERS, E. L. (2000). Distribution and Habitat'of the Southern Two-Lined Salamander, Eurycea cirrz'gem, in Will County, Illinois: Implications For Population Management and Monitoring. Jour. Iowa Acad. Sci. ID7, 3(163-I), 4_.

Amphibians of the United States
Eurycea
Extant Pleistocene first appearances
Taxonomy articles created by Polbot
Amphibians described in 1818